Mendon Township is a township in Chariton County, in the U.S. state of Missouri.

Mendon Township was established in 1840.

References

Townships in Missouri
Townships in Chariton County, Missouri